The MP-412 REX (Revolver for Export) was a Russian double-action/single-action revolver designed by the state-owned Izhevsk Mechanical Plant (IZHMEKH), with a break-action chamber and an automatic ejector, chambered for the .357 Magnum round.

History
The MP-412 was designed in the 1990s, and intended for export. However, it never entered production; it is unclear why this was, though it was likely due to its largest potential market, the United States, being closed, because of an agreement between U.S. President Bill Clinton and Russian President Boris Yeltsin in the 1990s, voluntarily banning the import of firearms from Russia to the United States.

Design and features
The MP-412 is unusual in that it has a break-open frame, rather than the typical swing-out cylinder design of most other modern revolvers. It also features a composite lower frame, consisting of steel with a polymer grip.

See also
List of modern Russian small arms and light weapons

References

Revolvers of Russia
.357 Magnum firearms
Izhevsk Mechanical Plant products